This is a list researchers in the physics field of loop quantum gravity who have Wikipedia articles.

 Abhay Ashtekar, Pennsylvania State University, United States
 John Baez, University of California, Riverside, United States
 Aurélien Barrau, Université Grenoble Alpes, Grenoble, France
 John W. Barrett, University of Nottingham, United Kingdom
 Eugenio Bianchi, Pennsylvania State University, United States
 Martin Bojowald, Pennsylvania State University, United States
 Alejandro Corichi, National Autonomous University of Mexico, Mexico
 Bianca Dittrich, Perimeter Institute for Theoretical Physics, Canada
 Laurent Freidel, Perimeter Institute for Theoretical Physics, Canada
 Rodolfo Gambini, University of the Republic, Uruguay
 Jorge Pullin, Louisiana State University, United States
 Carlo Rovelli, Centre de Physique Théorique, Centre National de la Recherche Scientifique (CNRS), Aix-Marseille University  and University of Toulon, Marseille, France
 Lee Smolin, Perimeter Institute for Theoretical Physics, Canada
 Thomas Thiemann, Friedrich-Alexander-Universität Erlangen-Nürnberg, Germany

See also 

List of quantum gravity researchers
List of contributors to general relativity

External links 
  Map of Loop Quantum Gravity people and research groups.
Centre de Physique Théorique, Marseille, France
Institute for Gravitation and the Cosmos, Penn State, United States
 Perimeter Institute for Theoretical Physics, Waterloo, Canada
Quantum Gravity Group IMATE UNAM, Morelia, México.

Loop quantum gravity researchers